Parapheromia configurata is a species of geometrid moth in the family Geometridae. It is found in North America.

The MONA or Hodges number for Parapheromia configurata is 6611.

Subspecies
These two subspecies belong to the species Parapheromia configurata:
 Parapheromia configurata configurata
 Parapheromia configurata falsata McDunnough

References

Further reading

 

Boarmiini
Articles created by Qbugbot
Moths described in 1898